Provincial road N760 (N760) is a road connecting N765 in IJsselmuiden with the town of Genemuiden.

References

External links

760
760